Pierre-Alfred Dedreux, who signed his works as Alfred de Dreux (23 March 1810, in Paris – 5 March 1860, in Paris) was a French portrait and animal painter, best known for his scenes with horses.

Biography 

Alfred de Dreux was born in 1810 into a privileged and colourful family. He was the first child and only son of the architect, Pierre-Anne Dedreux (1788-1834). His sister, Élise (1812-1846) was the mother of writer Louis Becq de Fouquières. After his father won the Prix de Rome for architecture in 1815, he lived at the Villa Médicis in Rome. While there, Théodore Géricault, a friend of the family, made portraits of him (pictured) and Élise.

In 1823, at the urging of his uncle, the painter Pierre-Joseph Dedreux-Dorcy, he began studying art with Géricault who was a family friend and a lover of horses. Later, he studied at the studio of Léon Cogniet. By this time, horses had become his favorite subject. His first exhibition at the Salon came in 1831 with the painting Interieur del Salon, which won him immediate fame. The following year, an equestrian portrait of the Duc d'Orléans became his entry to a position in the workshops of Eugène Isabey.

From 1840, he began the now famous series of portraits of horses from the stables of the Duc d'Orléans. The Scènes Equestres was completed in 1842 and the Petits Scènes Equestres in 1847. Dreux made a second portrait of the Duc together with his guards. King Louis-Philippe was so pleased with it that he invited Dreux to accompany him on an official trip to England. Following the revolution of 1848, the French royal family emigrated to England, where Dreux became a frequent visitor. He made many return trips there over the next few years, where the English passion for horses and fox-hunting earned him many commissions from the English aristocracy.

He returned to Paris in 1852 and opened a studio where he created more equestrian portraits, this time of Emperor Napoléon III and his family, but still made frequent trips to England. In 1857, he began sharing a studio with Paul Gavarni, who he met while there. This rumor is sometimes attributed to Charles Blanc. In 1951, it was repeated in a memoir by Dreux's grandnephew, the writer .

The logo of Hermès International is based on a drawing by Dreux.

Selected paintings

References

Further reading 
 Amaury de Louvencourt: Alfred de Dreux, 1810-1860, Galerie La Cymaise, Paris 1988, .
 Marie-Christine Renauld: Alfred de Dreux, le peintre du cheval, Caracole, Lausanne 1988, .
 Marie-Christine Renauld: Alfred de Dreux, le cheval, passion d'un dandy parisien, Action artistique de la ville de Paris, Paris 1997, .
 Guy Thibault, Florence de la Roncière: Alfred de Dreux, peintre de chevaux, Ville de Maisons-Laffitte, Maisons-Laffitte 1998, .

External links 

 ArtNet: More works by Dreux.

1810 births
1860 deaths
19th-century French painters
French male painters
Painters from Paris
Orientalist painters
Animal painters
Equestrian portraits
Deaths from liver disease
19th-century French male artists